Diz and Getz is an album by Dizzy Gillespie, featuring Stan Getz.

Track listing
 "It Don't Mean a Thing (If It Ain't Got That Swing)" (Duke Ellington, Irving Mills) – 6:40
 "I Let a Song Go Out of My Heart" (Ellington, Mills, Henry Nemo, John Redmond) – 6:19
 "Exactly Like You" (Dorothy Fields, Jimmy McHugh) – 5:01
 "It's the Talk of the Town" (Jerry Livingston, Al J. Neiburg, Marty Symes) – 6:55
 "Impromptu" (Dizzy Gillespie) – 7:50
 "One Alone" (Gillespie) – 3:04
 "Girl of My Dreams" (Sunny Clapp) – 3:19
 "Siboney, Pt. 1" (Ernesto Lecuona, Theodora Morse) – 4:23
 "Siboney, Pt. 2" – 4:10

Personnel
Dizzy Gillespie – trumpet
Stan Getz – tenor saxophone
Herb Ellis – guitar
Oscar Peterson – piano
Ray Brown – double bass
Max Roach – drums

On track 6 only:
Dizzy Gillespie – trumpet
Hank Mobley – tenor saxophone
Wade Legge – piano
Lou Hackney – double bass
Charli Persip – drums

References 

1955 albums
Dizzy Gillespie albums
Albums produced by Norman Granz
Verve Records albums
Stan Getz albums
Collaborative albums